Borsonia hirondelleae is a species of sea snail, a marine gastropod mollusk in the family Borsoniidae. The specific name hirondelleae refers to the ship Hirondelle, that was used to collect molluscs from the Bay of Biscay.

Description
The size of the shell attains 32 mm, its width : 12 mm.
The not very solid, whitish shell has a fusiform shape. The rather high shell is turriculate and contains seven convex whorls, subangular at the periphery, separated by a simple suture. The whorls contain longitudinal, nodulose ribs (13 on the penultimate whorl). The aperture is narrow and is half as long as the length of the shell. The front of the columella is slightly twisted and has a small callus. The outer lip is simple and sharp. It forms a rather narrow sinus.

Distribution
This marine species occurs off Morocco, off the Azores and in the Bay of Biscay

References

 Locard A., 1897-1898: Expéditions scientifiques du Travailleur et du Talisman pendant les années 1880, 1881, 1882 et 1883. Mollusques testacés. ; Paris, Masson vol. 1 [1897], p. 1-516 pl. 1-22 vol. 2 [1898], p. 517-1044 pl. 23-40

External links
 Holotype at MNHN, Paris

hirondelleae
Molluscs of the Atlantic Ocean
Molluscs of the Azores
Gastropods described in 1891